The Carrizo Bridges are a pair of timber stringer bridges which brought the main cross-continental highway of northern Arizona, the Old Trails Highway, across two branches of Carrizo Wash, an arroyo, in northern Arizona.  The highway through this area became U.S. Route 66, and the roadway eventually became a frontage road on the south side of Interstate 40.  It is labelled on some maps as Old Route 66.  The bridges are also known as Little Lithodendron Bridge and Lithodendron Bridge.

At least one source has used the term Carrizo Wash to describe the two arroyos, terming them as two branches.  The two branches/washes separately run south to the Puerco River, which parallels Interstate 40 to the south.  The western one is Little Lithodendron Wash and the eastern one is Lithodendron Wash.  Both bridges were constructed in 1932 by contractor Canion & Royden, and both were listed on the National Register of Historic Places in 1988.  Nearly identical in their original construction, they are now very different from one another, as the western has been maintained and the other was abandoned and has deteriorated.

The Lithodendron Wash Bridge, the eastern one of the pair of bridges, is a 22 span bridge. It was listed on the National Register of Historic Places in 1988.

A timber stringer bridge was the cheapest way to span spaces like arroyos.  It consists of parallel timber logs laid across timber pile bents.  These were by far the most common bridge type built in the state of Colorado, for example, historically.

Little Lithodendron Wash Bridge

The Little Lithodendron Wash Bridge, the western one of the pair, has 18 spans and was in excellent condition when listed in 1988.

See also
 National Register of Historic Places listings in Navajo County, Arizona

References

National Register of Historic Places in Navajo County, Arizona
Bridges completed in 1932
Bridges on the National Register of Historic Places in Arizona